Nathan James Fox (born 14 November 1992) is an English footballer who currently plays for National League North side Peterborough Sports where he plays as a defender.

Playing career

Notts County
Born in Leicester, Leicestershire, Fox signed a scholarship contract with Notts County on 13 May 2009, along with 14 other players. He made his Football League debut on 1 December for Notts County in the 4–0 home win over Darlington, replacing Matt Ritchie in the 86th minute as a substitute. He left the club at the end of the 2010–11 season. Fox played 90 minutes for a Derby County XI in a pre-season friendly against Burton Albion in July 2011.

Corby Town
Fox joined Conference North side Corby Town in July 2012.

King's Lynn Town
On 1 June 2019, Nathan was confirmed as signing for National League North side King's Lynn Town, along with Sam Kelly and Sonny Carey.

Fox played an integral part in helping secure ‘The Linnets’ The National League North title. He is perhaps known on Norfolk for his energetic runs and fantastic delivery into the danger area. Fox Contributed with 12 assists that season from left back.

Alfreton Town FC
After winning the Conference North title with Kings Lynn Town FC, Fox was reported to be signing for Kettering Town but opted for Alfreton Town FC.

Buxton
When football returned for the 2021–22 season following the suspension from COVID-19, Fox dropped down a division to sign for Northern Premier League Premier Division side Buxton. The club were crowned champions and reached the FA Cup second-round in his first season with the side.

Peterborough Sports
Despite promotion, Fox moved to fellow promoted National League North side Peterborough Sports in June 2022.

Style of play
Hans Backe described Fox saying; "He's typical left back, he's a quick and strong boy with a great left foot, whilst having the athletic attributes he can play and his ball retention is excellent."

Fox has matured into one of the best full backs/wing backs outside the National league his delivery into the box and ball retention goes hand in hand with his high fitness levels.

References

External links

1992 births
Living people
Footballers from Leicester
English footballers
Notts County F.C. players
Corby Town F.C. players
Kettering Town F.C. players
Rugby Town F.C. players
Stamford A.F.C. players
Slough Town F.C. players
Mickleover Sports F.C. players
Rushall Olympic F.C. players
Coalville Town F.C. players
Sutton Coldfield Town F.C. players
Redditch United F.C. players
Hednesford Town F.C. players
King's Lynn Town F.C. players
Alfreton Town F.C. players
Buxton F.C. players
Peterborough Sports F.C. players
English Football League players
National League (English football) players
Northern Premier League players
Southern Football League players
Association football defenders